Shake Off the Demon (1971) was the fourth album released by Brewer & Shipley.

Track listing
all songs Brewer & Shipley except where marked

Side A
"Shake Off the Demon" – 3:08
"Merciful Love" – 1:58
"Message from the Mission (Hold On)" – 3:09
"One by One" – 2:58
"When Everybody Comes Home" – 1:58

Side B
"Working On the Well" – 3:17
"Rock Me On the Water" (Jackson Browne) – 4:00
"Natural Child" – 3:46
"Back to the Farm" – 3:18
"Sweet Love" – 3:56

Personnel
Mike Brewer – vocals, guitars, piano, mouth harp, percussion
Tom Shipley – vocals, guitars, bass, banjo
Mark Naftalin – piano, organ, vibraphone
John Kahn – bass
John Cipollina – electric and slide electric guitars on "Shake Off the Demon"
Spencer Dryden, "Little John" Harteman III, Glen Walters – drums
Jose "Chepito" Areas – congas, bongos, timbales
David LaFlamme – electric violin

References
Shake Off the Demon, Brewer and Shipley. Kama Sutra Records/Buddah Records Distribution KSBS 2039 (original vinyl record release)

Brewer & Shipley albums
1971 albums
Albums recorded at Wally Heider Studios
Kama Sutra Records albums